Drag hunting or draghunting is a form of equestrian sport, where mounted riders hunt the trail of an artificially laid scent with hounds.

Description
Drag hunting is conducted in a similar manner to fox hunting, with a field of mounted riders following a pack of foxhounds hunting the trail of an artificial scent.  The primary difference between fox hunting and drag hunting is the hounds are trained to hunt a prepared scent trail laid by a person dragging a material soaked in aniseed or another strong smelling substance.

A drag hunt course is set in a similar manner to a cross country course, following a predetermined route over jumps and obstacles. Because it is predetermined, the route can be tailored to suit the riding abilities of the field.  The scent, or line, is usually laid 10 to 30 minutes prior to beginning of the hunt and there are usually three to four lines, of approximately  each, laid for a day of hunting.

Like fox hunting, in the United Kingdom and Ireland the drag hunting season usually starts in mid-October and continues through autumn and winter, finishing in the spring.

History
Drag hunting first became popular in the 19th century when Oxford and Cambridge universities both established packs of drag hounds.

The Pau Hunt, under the Mastership of Jasper Hall Livingston, documents a drag hunt on Saturday, November 26, 1847 between Pau, France and Gardères on the Route de Tarbes making a distance of 21 km (13 miles) in one hour.

Drag hunting soon became popular with the British Army, with the Household Cavalry establishing a pack in 1863 and the Royal Military Academy Sandhurst and the Royal Military Academy Woolwich both establishing packs in 1870.  The motivation of the British Army's interest in the sport was it was seen to provide excellent preparation for beginners and those who were about to enter the cavalry divisions.

As it does not involve the hunting of live animals, drag hunting remained legal in England and Wales after the passing of the Hunting Act of 2004.

Related sports

Trail hunting

A controversial, alternative to hunting animals with hounds in Great Britain. A trail of animal urine (most commonly fox) is laid in advance of the 'hunt', and then tracked by the hound pack and a group of followers; on foot, horseback, or both.

Hound trailing

Unlike other forms of hunting, the hounds are not followed by humans.

Clean boot hunting

Clean boot hunting uses packs of bloodhounds to follow the natural trail of a human's scent.

References

External links

Masters of the Draghounds and Bloodhounds Association website, mdbassociation.co.uk, retrieved 24 August 2017.

Dog sports
Equestrian sports
Hunting
Hunting with hounds